Tono or Toño is a masculine given name or nickname that is a diminutive form.  Tono is a Catalan, Galician and Spanish diminutive form of Anton, Antoni and Antonio and Toño is a Spanish diminutive form of Antonio. Both spellings are in use in Spain, parts of the United States, Mexico, Cuba, Dominican Republic, Guatemala, Honduras, El Salvador, Nicaragua, Costa Rica, Western Panama, Colombia, Venezuela, Peru, Ecuador, Bolivia, Chile, Paraguay, Argentina, Uruguay, and the Falkland Islands, while Tōno is a japanese surname.

Nickname/stage name
 Tono (artist), professional/stage name of the Japanese manga artist
 Tono, pseudonym of Antonio Lara de Gavilán (1896–1978), Spanish humorist and writer
 Toño (footballer, born 1979), nickname for Antonio Rodríguez Martínez, (born 1979), Spanish footballer, goalkeeper
 Toño (footballer, born 1986), nickname for Antonio Ramírez Martínez, (born 1986), Spanish footballer, goalkeeper
 Toño (footballer, born 1989), nickname for Antonio García Aranda, (born 1989), Spanish footballer, defender
 Tono (singer), professional/stage name of the Japanese actress and singer
 Toño Bicicleta, nickname of Francisco Antonio García López (1943–1995), Puerto Rican criminal
 Toño Rosario, nickname of Máximo Antonio del Rosario, (born 1955), Dominican musician
 Toño Salazar, nickname of Antonio Salazar, (1897–1986), Salvadoran caricaturist, illustrator and diplomat

Given name
 Tono Andreu (1915–1981), Argentine film actor
 Tono Maria, Brazilian freak
 Toño Mauri, Mexican singer and actor
 Tono Stano (born 1960), Slovak photographer

Surname
 Asuka Tono, Japanese actress
 Eijirō Tōno (1907–1994), Japanese actor
 Hiroaki Tōno (born 1939), Japanese Go player
 Kanami Tōno, Japanese guitarist of Band-Maid
 Maiko Tōno, (born 1973), Japanese actress
 Shun Tono (born 1986), Japanese baseball player

Fictional characters
 Jek Tono Porkins, Star Wars character
Tigre Toño, the Spanish name for Tony The Tiger.

See also

Tolo (surname)
Ton (given name)
Tona (name)
Tone (name)
Tong (surname)
Tonho (name)
Tonio (name)
Tonko
Tony (name)
Toon (name)
Toso (surname)
Toto (given name)
Toto (nickname)
Toto (surname)

Notes

Catalan masculine given names
Galician masculine given names
Spanish masculine given names